Shaheen Siddique (born 21 February 1989) is an Indian actor who appears in Malayalam films. The son of film actor Siddique, Shaheen made his debut with the Malayalam film Pathemari (2015) directed by National Award winner Salim Ahamed. He plays the role of Mammootty's son in the film. He also starred in director G. Marthandan's second directorial venture titled Acha Dhin (2015). His height is 5.7 feet.

Personal life 
Shaheen completed his schooling from The Choice School. After his education, Shaheen took business as his career, appearing in films occasionally.

Film career
Shaheen was invited to make his filmy debut in Pathemari directed by Salim Ahamed. He plays a guy in his early 20s, the son of Pallickkal Narayanan and Nalini played by Mammotty and Jewel Mary respectively. Siddique also plays an important role in the movie, but  there are no combination scenes of the father and the son. He has also starred in director G. Marthandan's second directorial venture titled Acha Din. Shaheen acted in a short film titled, 'The Backstager' in early 2018 which was released on June 5. He got two awards for this short film. Second Best Actor in Kerala State Television Awards 2018  and Best Actor in CONTACT short film festival 2019.

Awards

Filmography

Short films

References

Living people
Male actors from Kochi
Male actors in Malayalam cinema
Indian male film actors
1989 births
21st-century Indian male actors